A Night at the Hip Hopera is the third album by The Kleptones.  It fused Queen's rock music with rap vocals and many sound bites from movies (such as Ferris Bueller's Day Off) and other sources.  Unlike 1992's cancelled BASIC Queen Bootlegs album and despite its title, it is considered a bastard pop album rather than a hip-hop album.

On 8 November 2004 Waxy, the main site that hosted A Night At The Hip Hopera, received a cease & desist notice from the Walt Disney Company (Hollywood Records) for illegal sampling of songs by Queen, similar to the banning of DJ Danger Mouse's The Grey Album.

Track listing
"Precession" – 2:06
Samples – Queen, "Procession"
Samples – Queen, Queen: The eYe soundtrack
Sound bites – Sigue Sigue Sputnik, "She's My Man"
Sound bites – Flash Gordon
Sound bites – The Dramatics, "Introduction"
Sound bites – GG Allin, "Intro (M. Board)"
Sound bites – Kosmo Vinyl, introducing The Clash (Kingston Advice: Live in Jamaica 1982 bootleg)
Sound bites – Frankie Goes to Hollywood, "One February Friday"
"See" – 4:14
Samples – Queen, "One Vision"
Samples – Queen, Queen: The eYe soundtrack
Samples – Quentin Harris, "Let's Be Young"
Samples – KRS-One, "Hip Hop vs. Rap" 
Samples – Grandmaster Flash & the Furious Five,  "The Message" 
Samples – Kelis, "Milkshake"
Sound bites – Aqua Teen Hunger Force (episode: "Revenge of the Mooninites")
Sound bites – Ferris Bueller's Day Off
Sound bites – Lil Jon and the Eastside Boyz, "Luke Talkin Shit"
Sound bites – Ludacris
Sound bites – JAM Creative Productions jingles
Sound bites – World News Tonight (9 March 2004 broadcast)
"Live" – 3:10
Samples – Queen, "Keep Yourself Alive"
Samples – Afrika Bambaataa & Family, "Got to Get Up/Just Get Up and Dance" 
Sound bites – Calvert DeForest, Run-D.M.C. music video – "King of Rock"
"Bite" – 4:02
Samples – Queen, "Another One Bites the Dust"
Samples – Justin Timberlake featuring Clipse, "Like I Love You"
Samples – Ol' Dirty Bastard featuring Kelis, "Got Your Money"
Samples – Missy Elliott, "Pass That Dutch"
Sound bites – Disco Fever infomercial
Sound bites – Fear, "I Don't Care About You" (live, as featured in The Decline of Western Civilization)
Sound bites – TV Offal ("Honest Obituary" segment)
"Jazz" – 4:48
Samples – Queen, "More of That Jazz"
Samples – Queen, "We Will Rock You"
Samples – Task Force, "Tears on My Pillowcase"
Sound bites – 5 Headed Retard
Sound bites – Jane's Addiction bootleg
Sound bites – Timothy Leary
"Rock" – 2:45
Samples – Queen, "We Will Rock You"
Samples – Peaches, "Rock Show"
Samples – Killa Kela, "Heavy Artillery"
Sound bites – Jane's Addiction bootleg
"Love" – 0:31
Samples – Queen, "Tenement Funster"
Sound bites – Brian May interview
"Fight" – 3:20
Samples – Queen, "Fight from the Inside"
Samples – Dilated Peoples, "Marathon"
"Fuck" – 1:09
Samples – Queen, "Seven Seas of Rhye"
Samples – Queen, "Keep Yourself Alive"
Sound bites – PAMS jingles
Sound bites – Stereophile test CD
Sound bites – Pink Noise at -20dB
"Play" – 3:41
Samples – Queen, "Play the Game"
Samples – De La Soul, "Much More"
Samples – Electric Six, "Gay Bar"
Samples – Meat Loaf, "You Took the Words Right Out of My Mouth"
Sound bites – 50 Cent
"Ride" – 3:10
Samples – Queen, "Bicycle Race"
Samples – Eminem, "My Name Is"
Sound bites – 5 Headed Retard
Sound bites – Black Chiney
Sound bites – Ferris Bueller's Day Off
Sound bites – Britney Spears
"Sniff" – 4:20
Samples – Queen and David Bowie, "Under Pressure"
Samples – Belinda Carlisle, "Heaven Is a Place on Earth"
Samples – Vanilla Ice, "Ice Ice Baby"
Samples – Prince Paul featuring De La Soul, "More Than U Know"
Samples – Adam Freeland, "We Want Your Soul"
Sound bites – The Lox, "Brains...Take One (Skit)"
Sound bites – Lil Jon and the Eastside Boyz, "Weedman (Skit)"
"Ridicule" – 0:36
Samples – Queen, "Queen Talks"
"Plan" – 4:49
Samples – Queen, "I'm Going Slightly Mad"
Samples – Herbaliser featuring Latyrx, "8-Point Agenda"
"Break" – 3:11
Sound bites – Ferris Bueller's Day Off
Samples – Queen, "I Want to Break Free"
Samples – Aaliyah featuring Timbaland, "Try Again"
Samples – Beastie Boys, "Shake Your Rump"
Samples – Beastie Boys, "Body Movin'"
Samples – Beastie Boys, "Alive"
"Listen" – 3:59
Samples – Queen, "Radio Ga Ga"
Samples – Beastie Boys, "Shake Your Rump"
Samples – Beastie Boys, "Intergalactic"
Samples – Beastie Boys, "Root Down"
Samples – Beastie Boys, "Sure Shot"
Sound bites – Hancock's Half Hour
"Work" – 2:21
Samples – Queen, "Machines (Back to Humans)"
Samples – Missy Elliott, "She's a Bitch"
Sound bites – Dilbert (episode: "The Gift")
Sound bites – Flavor Flav
Sound bites – Richard Hamming, IBM slogan "Machines should work, people should think" (From Raymond Scott's "IBM MT/ST: The Paperwork Explosion")
Sound bites – Star Trek: The Next Generation
"Come" – 4:26
Samples – Queen, "Spread Your Wings"
Samples – Common featuring Erykah Badu and Q-Tip, "Come Close"
"Expose" – 3:15
Samples – Queen, "Flash"
Samples – Brandy and Monica, "The Boy Is Mine"
Samples – Beats International, "Dub Be Good to Me"
Samples – Jethro Tull, "The Third Hoorah"
Samples – Randall Jones, "Up Out of Here"
"Jerk" – 5:04
Samples – Queen, "A Kind of Magic"
Samples – Morris Day and The Time, "Jerk Out"
Samples – Detroit Grand Pubahs, "Sandwiches"
Sound bites – 5 Headed Retard
Sound bites – Ferris Bueller's Day Off
Sound bites – Keith Murray
Sound bites – The Kinks interview (as featured on BBC Sessions 1964-1977)
Sound bites – Neon Genesis Evangelion (English dub)
"Save" – 4:13
Samples – Queen, "Save Me"
Samples – DJ Vadim featuring Atmosphere, "Edie Brickell"
Sound bites – Keith Murray
"Stop" – 3:28
Samples – Queen, "Don't Stop Me Now"
Samples – Looptroop featuring Chords and Timbuktu, "Heads Day Off"
Sound bites – Keith Murray
Sound bites – Erick Sermon
Sound bites – Kanye West, "Lil Jimmy Skit"
"Question" – 5:28
Samples – Queen, "Who Wants to Live Forever"
Sound bites – Alfasound jingle
Sound bites – Aqua Teen Hunger Force (episode: "Revenge of the Mooninites")
Sound bites – The Big Lebowski
Sound bites – Blade Runner
Sound bites – The Decline of Western Civilization
Sound bites – Fight Club
Sound bites – Head
Sound bites – Hugh Hefner interview
Sound bites – JAM Creative Productions jingle
Sound bites – Neon Genesis Evangelion
Sound bites – World News Tonight (9 March 2004 broadcast)

Related track

"Bo Rhap" – 6:50
Although not part of the A Night At The Hip Hopera album, this unique track mashes up multiple versions of Queen's legendary song, Bohemian Rhapsody. It was released as a Christmas 2004 single (after the album), and since Bohemian Rhapsody was not among the songs sampled by the Kleptones for the album, it's possible that "Bo Rhap" was meant to be part of it, or at the very least a bonus track.
"Kill" & "Smash"
While neither are on the album, they are included on the unreleased tracks compilation Shits & Giggles.

See also
Bastard pop

External links
 A Night At The Hip-Hopera download page
 Waxy
 Cease and desist letter from EMI #1
 DownHill Battle
 Download "Bo Rhap"
 Podcast of discussion among John Batelle, Eric Kleptone, and EMI executive David Munns

The Kleptones albums
Queen (band)
2004 remix albums
Rap operas